The Boys Singles tournament of the 2014 BWF World Junior Championships was held on April 13–18. Last year winner, Heo Kwang-hee couldn't defend his title due to the age eligibility.

Lin Guipu won the title after beating his fellow countryman Shi Yuqi in the final by 20-22, 21-8, 21-18.

Seeded

  Jonatan Christie (quarter-final)
  Shi Yuqi (final)
  Pham Cao Cuong (third round)
  Zhao Junpeng (semi-final)
  Cheam June Wei (quarter-final)
  Rasmus Gemke (second round)
  Aditya Joshi (second round)
  Lin Guipu (champion)
  Anders Antonsen (third round)
  Tanguy Citron (third round)
  Anthony Ginting (semi-final)
  Lee Cheuk Yiu (third round)
  Lu Chia-hung (third round)
  Muhammad Bayu Pangisthu (fourth round)
  Kantaphon Wangcharoen (fourth round)
  Max Weisskirchen (third round)

Draw

Finals

Top Half

Section 1

Section 2

Section 3

Section 4

Bottom Half

Section 5

Section 6

Section 7

Section 8

References
Main Draw

2014 BWF World Junior Championships
2014 in youth sport